Nordic combined is a winter sport in which athletes compete in cross-country skiing and ski jumping. The Nordic combined at the Winter Olympics has been held since the first ever Winter Olympics in 1924, while the FIS Nordic Combined World Cup has been held since 1983. Many Nordic combined competitions use the Gundersen method, where placement in the ski jumping segment results in time (dis)advantages added to the contestant's total in the cross-country skiing segment (e.g. the ski jumping winner starts the cross-country skiing race at 00:00:00 while the one with the lowest jumping score starts with the longest time penalty).

History 
The first major competition was held in 1892 in Oslo at the first Holmenkollen ski jump. King Olav V of Norway was an able jumper and competed in the Holmenkollen Ski Festival in the 1920s. Nordic combined was in the 1924 Winter Olympics and has been on the program ever since. Until the 1950s, the cross-country race was held first, followed by the ski jumping. This was reversed as the difference in the cross-country race tended to be too big to overcome in ski jumping. The sport has been dominated by the Norwegians, supported by the Finns. It was not until 1960 that the Nordic grip on this discipline was broken when West German Georg Thoma won the gold medal at the 1960 Winter Olympics.

It was decided in early-November 2016 that women's competitions were to be established on FIS-level starting during the second half of the 2010s with inclusion at world championships starting in 2021 and at the Olympic Winter Games in 2022. But Olympic debut for women in 2022 was cancelled in July 2018 by IOC who was asking for more development time for this discipline; they likely will be added in 2026. In May 2018 the FIS Congress made several decisions regarding the inclusion of women in the sport of Nordic Combined.  At the 2022 Winter Olympics, Nordic combined is the only sport with exclusively men's events. As of 2019, women will be officially included in FIS Junior World Championships. It was confirmed that 2021 will mark the start of the FIS World Championship program for women (senior level).  2018 marks the second year of the Continental Cup program for women, which will include a total of 12 events.

Competition 

Formats and variations currently used in the World Cup are:

 Individual Gundersen: competition starts with one competition jump from a normal or large hill. Later on the same day, the  cross-country race takes place. The winner starts at 00:00:00 and all other athletes start with time disadvantages according to their jumping score. The first to cross the finish line is the winner.
  Nordic Combined Triple: introduced in the 2013–14 FIS Nordic Combined World Cup, it features three different events on three days and one overall winner who is awarded extra World Cup points and prize money:
 Day 1: 1 jump &  Prologue
 Day 2: 1 jump &  Individual Gundersen (Top 50 from Day 1's competition)
 Day 3: 2 jumps &  Final Individual Gundersen (Top 30 from Day 2's competition)
 Team Event: introduced in the 1980s, one team consists of four athletes who have one competition jump each. The total score of all four athletes determines the time disadvantages for the start of the ensuing  cross-country race. The first team to cross the finish line wins.
 Team Sprint: teams consist of two athletes each. In the ski jumping part, every athlete makes one competition jump like in the Individual Gundersen or Team Event formats and the time behind for the start of the successive cross-country race. The team to arrive first at the finish line wins the competition.

Included in the rules but currently not used in World Cup:
 Penalty Race: instead adding a time disadvantage, distance is added to the cross-country part.
 Mass Start: the only format in which the cross-country part takes place before the ski jumping. All competitors start into a  cross-country race in free technique at the same time. The final cross-country times are then converted into points for the ski jumping part. The winner is determined in a points-based system.

Events in the Olympics are: the sprint K120 individual, ski jumping K90 (70m), and Team/4x5km.

Equipment
 Ski bindings: secure only the toe of the boot to the ski. In cross-country, it must be placed so that not more than 57% of the entire ski length is used as the front part. In jumping, a cord or aluminum post attaches the heel of the boot to the ski to prevent tips from dropping and/or wobbling of skis during flight.
 Ski boot
 For jumping, a high-backed, flexible yet firm boots with a low cut at the front, designed to allow the skier to lean forward during flight.
 For cross-country a skating boot is used.
 Ski suit and helmet
 Skis: jumping skis may have a length of a maximum 145% of the total body height of the competitor. Cross-country skis may be up to 2 meters long.
 Ski poles 
 Ski wax: glide wax for speed is used in both types, and kick wax is used in cross-country.

References

 
Cross-country skiing
Ski jumping
Snow sports
Sports originating in Norway
Winter Olympic sports
Nordic skiing
Combination events